Leontyevo is a rural locality (a village) in Penkinskoye Rural Settlement, Kameshkovsky District, Vladimir Oblast, Russia. The population was 22 as of 2010.

Geography 
Leontyevo is located 25 km southwest of Kameshkovo (the district's administrative centre) by road. Dvoriki is the nearest rural locality.

References 

Rural localities in Kameshkovsky District
Vladimirsky Uyezd